Jon Mueller (born 1970 in Waukesha, Wisconsin) is an American percussionist and composer, active in experimental and rock disciplines.

Early life and education
Jon Mueller was introduced to music through his parents, and began taking guitar and piano lessons at an early age. After quitting both, he became interested in the drums after his friend inherited a drumset. The instrument appealed to him due to its focus away from melody. In an interview with Natasha Pickowicz, Mueller stated, "Hitting the drums and cymbals sounded good, no matter the combination." He then began taking snare drum lessons before moving to a full kit.

In 1990, he studied with jazz musician Hal Russell while attending Columbia College in Chicago.

Mueller graduated in 1995 from Cardinal Stritch University in Milwaukee with a bachelor's degree in English. In 2008, he earned his Master of Business Administration degree.

Career
In the 1990s, he met guitarist Chris Rosenau, with whom he developed a long-time association. Together, they founded the groups Pele and Collections of Colonies of Bees. The latter group later co-founded Volcano Choir with Bon Iver's Justin Vernon. Their debut album Unmap reached number 92 on the Billboard 200 chart.

He has also worked with a variety of musicians such as James Plotkin, Rhys Chatham, Asmus Tietchens, Z'EV, Jason Kahn, Marcus Schmickler, Bhob Rainey, Jack Wright, and others.

In 2003, he began experimenting with vibrating drums on top of speakers. This direction is documented on his What's Lost is Something Important CD, Metals CD, Physical Changes LP/CD/DVD, and Alphabet of Movements LP.

He has performed solo and in various groupings throughout North America, Europe, United Kingdom, and Japan, in venues including New Museum (New York), Arnolfini (Bristol, UK), Musée des Beaux-Arts de Montréal, (Montréal, QC), Issue Project Room (New York), Guggenheim (New York), and Cafe OTO (London, UK). His solo and collaborative recordings have been released by labels such as Table of the Elements, Polyvinyl Records, Type Recordings, Jagjaguwar, Hometapes, Important Records, Taiga Records, and many others.

In 1999, he formed the record label, magazine, and music distribution company Crouton. Crouton published over 40 releases, mostly in limited editions, featuring the work of The Hafler Trio, Asmus Tietchens, Daniel Menche, Robert Hampson, Robert Haigh, Jarboe, Jason Kahn, Aranos, Alessandro Bosetti, Osso Exotico, Z'EV, Collections of Colonies of Bees, Pele, and many others, as well as his own releases. Crouton also organized events in the Milwaukee and Chicago areas. These were documented by the press and even filmed as part of a PBS documentary (on Ken Vandermark). The business closed in 2009.

In 2009, he was referred to by Pitchfork as "an audacious ringleader for new music."

In 2011, he started his Death Blues project, described by Mueller as, "a multidisciplinary project that addresses the inevitability of death as impetus to become more present in each moment." Performances for the project took place throughout the U.S., including Hopscotch Fest and Alverno Presents.

Public Speaking
He has spoken to audiences about creativity and new business approaches at The Music Forum: Loyola University (NOLA), WMSE's Radio Summercamp (Milwaukee, WI), Viva! Festival (Montreal), Wesleyan University (Middleton, CT), PRSA (Milwaukee, WI), and MARN (Milwaukee, WI).

Writing
He has written a novella, Pianobread (1999), a box of short stories, Endings (2004), and has contributed non-fiction writing and reviews for ChangeThis.com, Pear Noir!, The Shepherd Express, OnMilwaukee, Amoeba Records Hollywood, and contributed to The 100 Best Business Books of All Time (Penguin/Portfolio) by Jack Covert and Todd Sattersten.

Discography

Solo 
Here: An Advanced Study of Death Blues CD, Rhythmplex (US), 2012
Alphabet of Movements LP, Type Records (UK), 2011
V/A – Coupling: Dedicated to the Man and Based on the Work of Stan Brakhage CD, Silent Media (US), 2011
The Whole CD/LP+bonus CD, Type Records (UK), 2010
Halves cassette, Notice Recordings (US), 2010
Physical Changes LP/CD/DVD, Radium/Table of the Elements (US), 2009
Jon Mueller/Gino Robair split – "Dot Feed" track on split 3" CD, Compost and Height (UK), 2009
Strung 12", Table of the Elements (US), 2008
Hollow Voices/Singing Hands cassette, Friends and Relatives (US), 2008
Metals CD, Table of the Elements (US), 2008
Emerson Hi-Fidelity CD, Autumn Records (US), 2005
What's Lost Is Something Important. What's Found Is Something Not Revealed. CD, Crouton (US), 2005
V/A: the audible still-life CD – "Heat", Stasisfield (US), 2003
V/A: Just Drums CD – "Pop", Fever Pitch (US), 2003
Solo Percussion For Two – "Beyond the Surface of Actions", Split 7" with Jeph Jerman, No Information Records (US), 2003
"A Wooden Bicycle" MP3 release, Stassisfield.com (US), 2002
Folktales No. 2 – "How I Learned To Breathe" 3" CD, Crouton (US), 2001

Collaborations 
Volcano Choir - Repave (2013)
Jon Mueller + James Plotkin – Terminal Velocity 2xLP, Taiga Records (US), 2012
V/A (Mueller appears with James Plotkin) – Utech Records Music Fest 2xCD, Utech Records/KFJC (US), 2012
V/A (Mueller appears with Burkhard Beins) – Bridges 2xLP, Machinefabriek (NL), 2011
John Cage – The Works for Percussion I DVD, Mode Records (US), 2011
Jon Mueller + Z'EV – HYDratioN LP, Important Records (US), 2010
Jason Kahn + Jon Mueller – Phase digital release, FSS (US), 2010
Volcano Choir – Unmap LP/CD, Jagjaguwar (US), 2009
MOUTHS – 3v1/3v2 CD, Absurd (GR), 2008
Jon Mueller and Jason Kahn – Topography CD, Xeric/Crouton (US), 2008
Melissa St. Pierre – Specimens CD, Radium (US), 2008
Rhys Chatham – Guitar Trio is My Life 3xCD, Radium (US), 2008
Asmus Tietchens and Jon Mueller – Acht Stücke CD, Auf Abwegen (DE), 2007
Jeph Jerman and Jon Mueller – Nodes and Anti-Nodes DVD, Crouton (US), 2007
Tim Catlin/Jon Mueller – Plates and Wires CD, Crouton (US), 2007
Jon Mueller/Martijn Tellinga – bowl, helicopter CDep, Korm Plastics (NL), 2007
MOUTHS – 1v2e LP, Entr'acte (UK), 2006
Jason Kahn/Jon Mueller – Supershells CD, Formed Records (US), 2006
Werner Moebius/Jon Mueller/Jim Schoenecker – Amalgam CD, Utech Records (US), 2006
The Portable Quartet – Take The Train CD, Crouton (US), 2005
Carol Genetti/Jon Mueller/Jack Wright – Nom Tom CD, Spring Garden Music (US), 2005
Jon Mueller and Kaveh Soofi – Endings book, Crouton (US), 2004
Jon Mueller and Jim Schoenecker – The Interview CD, Longbox Recordings (US), 2004
Jason Kahn and Jon Mueller – Papercuts CD, Crouton (US), 2004
Jon Mueller/Bhob Rainey/Jim Schoenecker – S/T CD, Crouton (US), 2004
Hat Melter (Hess/Klatt/Mueller/Turner) – Unknown Album LP, Crouton (US), 2003
Asmus Tietchens/Jon Mueller – 7 Stücke CD, Auf Abwegen (DE), 2003
Raccoons (Jon Mueller/Hal Rammel/Chris Rosenau) – Mother 2xCD, Crouton (US), 2002
Aranos/Mueller/Rosenau – Bleeding In Behind Pastel Screens CD, Crouton (US), 2001
Nelson-Raney, Steve/Jon Mueller – Cutting Off The Edge Of Time CD, Penumbra Music (US), 2001
Lancaster, Byard Trio – S/T CD, Soutrane Recording Company (US), 2000
Field Of Sound – S/T CD, Soutrane Recording Company (US), 2000
Castle Broadway – S/T CD, Soutrane Recording Company (US), 2000
Raccoons (Jon Mueller/Hal Rammel/Chris Rosenau) – S/T CD– Crouton (US), 2000
Pianobread – S/T, book/CD box (performed on CD and also wrote novella of the same title in box) Crouton (US), 1999

Collections of Colonies of Bees 
Giving CD/LP, Hometapes (US), 2011
Giving CD, Contrarede (JP), 2010
Toe/Collections of Colonies of Bees split CD, Contrarede (JP), 2009
Impala Eardrums CD/LP, "Athlete," Radium/Table of the Elements (US), 2008
Six Guitars 12", Table of the Elements (US), 2008
Birds CD/LP, Radium/Table of the Elements (US), 2008
Customer CD/LP, Polyvinyl Records (US), 2004, CD on Some of Us (JP), 2004
Eyebrows CD, Self-released for Japan tour, 2004
meyou CD, Crouton (US), 2003
fa.ce (a CD, Crouton (US), 2002
Rance CD, Crouton (US), 2000
S/T CD, the Rosewood Union (UK), 1999

Pele 
A Scuttled Bender in a Watery Closet 2xCD, Polyvinyl Record Co. (US), 2009
Last Show 2xDVD, Contrarede (JP), 2009
"Drop Attack," Pele/Toe split CD, Dis(ign) Muzyq (JP), 2001, 7" on Polyvinyl Records (US), 2004
"Cigarette Papers," Toe: Re:designed CD, Catune (JP), 2003
Enemies CD/LP, Polyvinyl Record Co. (US), 2002
"Hagoo," Split LP with Rhythm of Black Lines, Sixgunlover Records (US), 2002
"Five Years in Four Minutes," Sangatsu remix CD, Weather Records (JP), 2001
"Gas The Nutsy," Re Direction compilation CD, Polyvinyl Record Co. (US), 2001
The Nudes CD/LP, Polyvinyl Record Co. (US), 2000
Realize It 12"/CD, Crouton (US), 2000
"Positive Woman," it goes without saying compilation CD, Sign Language Records (US), 1999
Elephant CD, Sign Language Records (US), 1999 (also released on Polyvinyl Records (US), 2003)
"Blue Cecil b/w Apiary" 12", the Rosewood Union (UK), 1998
Emergency Room Egg CD, Crouton (US) + Japan only edition, 1998
People Living with Animals. Animals Kill People. CD, Star Star Stereo (US), 1998
Teaching the History of Teaching Geography CD, Star Star Stereo (US),
(also released on the Rosewood Union (UK)), 1998

Telecognac 
Memory CD, Crouton (US), 2001
Over (Jarboe/Telecognac) CD, Crouton (US), 2000
Flor (Story and 3" CD) Crouton (US), 2000
"The Possibility Of A Face," Crouton Number Two CD, Crouton (US), 1999
"Paper weight," Various 500 Lock-Grooves by 500 Artists LP, RRRecords (US), 1998
"White Christmas," angels we have heard in hi-fi compilation cassette, Molotov Cocktail Recordings (US), 1997
"Pause Until I Mocket," Existence compilation LP (US), 1997
S/T CD, Lombardi Recording Company (US), 1997

External links
 
 Death Blues
 Article in Blurt Magazine
 Paris Transatlantic interview

References

American percussionists
American experimental musicians
Polyvinyl Record Co. artists
1970 births
Living people
Volcano Choir members